Lukavica is a village and municipality of the Zvolen District in the Banská Bystrica Region of Slovakia.

Gallery 

Villages and municipalities in Zvolen District